Road Wars may refer to:

Road Wars (TV series), a British reality television programme
Road Wars (novel), a novel by Laurence James
Road Wars (toy line), a 1990s die-cast model car toy line
Road Wars (film), a 2015 American movie

See also 
Street Wars (disambiguation)